Glyn Robert Treagus (born 10 December 1974) is an English cricketer. Treagus is a right-handed batsman who bowls right-arm medium pace.

In 2000, Treagus made his List-A debut and his debut for Dorset against Norfolk in the 2nd round of the 2000 NatWest Trophy. From 2000 to 2004, Treagus represented Dorset in 7 List-A matches, with his final List-A match for the county coming against Yorkshire in the 2nd round of the 2004 Cheltenham & Gloucester Trophy.

In his 7 List-A matches for Dorset he scored 104 runs at a batting average of 17.33, with a single half century high score of 76 against the Worcestershire Cricket Board in the 1st round of the 2003 Cheltenham & Gloucester Trophy which was played in 2002.

In the same season he made his List-A debut, Treagus also made his debut for Dorset in the Minor Counties Championship against Herefordshire in 2000. From 2000 to present, Treagus has played 56 Minor County matches for Dorset, including in the final of the 2000 Minor Counties Championship against Cumberland which Dorset won by 5 wickets.

External links
Glyn Treagus at Cricinfo
Glyn Treagus at CricketArchive

1974 births
Living people
People from Rustington
English cricketers
Dorset cricketers
Hampshire Cricket Board cricketers
People educated at King Edward VI School, Southampton